Into the Deep: America, Whaling & the World is a two-hour documentary by Ric Burns about the history of the whaling industry in the United States. The film was initially released on May 10, 2010.

Overview
A film chronicling the American whaling industry from its origins in New England in the 17th century, through the golden age of deep-sea whaling, up to its decline following the Civil War. Narrated by Willem Dafoe, this film binds the story of American capitalism on the rise with a case study in maritime culture. The fate of the whaleship Essex—which set sail from Nantucket in the summer of 1819—is interwoven with the story of a young Herman Melville, whose own imaginative voyage into the deep would give rise to one of the greatest works of American literature, Moby Dick.

Other voices heard in the film include Robert Sean Leonard as Herman Melville, Josh Hamilton as Owen Chase & Peleg Folger and Vincent Kartheiser as Thomas Nickerson.

Awards and nominations
31st News & Documentary Emmy Awards (2010) - Outstanding Nonfiction Series (nominated) 
History Makers Nomination Best History Production 
International Documentary Association Awards Nomination

Soundtrack
The documentary's original soundtrack, composed by Brian Keane, was released by Valley Entertainment on CD and in digital formats.

See also
 In the Heart of the Sea, a 2015 American film based on the non-fiction book of the same name

References

External links
 PBS
 Steeplechase Official Site
 Mike Hale's review in The New York Times

2010 television films
2010 films
American Experience
Documentary films about whaling
Films directed by Ric Burns